Čkembari are an Ultras group, established in 1985, who support the sports clubs from Bitola, North Macedonia that compete under the Pelister banner, mainly FK Pelister in football and RK Eurofarm Pelister in handball.

History
The group was founded in 1985 when a caravan of 21 buses traveled to support RK Pelister who was playing against Partizan Bjelovar in a handball relegation play-off match. At that time they used the name BMČM - Bitolčani, Drinkers, Čkembari, Macedonians later shortened to just Čkembari. Soon after, the first green and white banners were created that read: „Hell Boys“ and „Green Conquerors“ which started organized support for Pelister at every match. From that time until today Čkembari had visited many cities in the former Yugoslavia, including: Belgrade, Zagreb, Banja Luka, Uroševac and Leskovac. After the independence of Macedonia the handball club Pelister wrote Macedonian handball history achieving many meaningful results at home and abroad. At that time, Čkembari as the eighth player traveled throughout Macedonia and Europe to support them. The most memorable trips were in: Kielce (Poland), Poznan (Poland), Lemgo (Germany), Gudme (Denmark), Flensburg (Germany), Paris (France), Varna (Bulgaria) and Skjern (Denmark). Numerous road trips, over 2,000 members, countless choreography and pyro shows, as well as major incidents in the history of the Macedonian Tifo scene are all factors that have shown why Čkembari are one of the best Ultra groups in the country. After Eurofarm Rabotnik and Pelister merged, Čkembari became Eurofarm Pelister supporters.

Čkembari have a friendly relations with the Lozari from Kavadarci and Torfiorze from Belchatow, Poland (Fans of GKS  Belchatow)

Subgroups
Čkembari are composed of several subgroups that have their own banners and flags, and usually consist of fans who are from the same neighborhood in Bitola. The first official subgroup of Čkembari was "Chaos" from the district Nova Bitola, established in 1985 and dissolved in 1996, in 1992 its successor "Extremo Karpos" was formed which is still active today. Later, in 2004 were created the still active Green Front from the settlement Yeni Maale. In 2008 were formed the latest subgroups, "Ultras Bair" from the Bair neighborhood which is one of the largest settlements in the city, and the final subgroup "Boys from Centar" - (BFC) who are from the downtown area, also from Nova Bitola "Ckembari-Nova Bitola"

Rivalry

The biggest rivalry in the Macedonian Tifo scene is the one between Čkembari and Komiti. The rivalry began in the season 1989/1990 at a match in Skopje, between FK Vardar and Red Star Belgrade. A conflict occurred between the "Skopje fans" and a few Bitola fans who went to cheer for Vardar, who at that time was the most popular Macedonian football club in the former Yugoslavia. On 8 March 1991 in Bitola, Pelister and Vardar met in the Yugoslav second league and the first incident occurred. The match was abandoned following a fight between Čkembari and the police. From that day forward, started the big rivalry between Čkembari and Komiti along with the Pelister-Vardar match becoming the Eternal derby of Macedonia. At these clashes there have been many incidents but the most famous one took place in Bitola, back on 13 June 1993 when the match between Pelister and Vardar was never even started. Čkembari set fire to the wooden bleacher seats, collapsed the protective fence and began to fight with the police while trying to reach the Komiti. In the riot a dozen policemen were injured and about 200 Čkembari were detained.   For all these events, sports commentator from MRTV, Atanas Kostovski, once said: "Čkembari-Police 2:0".

Their other rivals are Majmuni from Prilep which supporting FK Pobeda. Also they are rivals with Ballistet, ultras of KF Shkëndija and with Shvercerat who support FK Shkupi.

References

External links
Official Website

Group Info
Group Pictures
Group Videos

Ultras groups
FK Pelister
Sport in Bitola